Such may refer to:

 Bob Such (fl. 1990s), Australian politician
 Alec John Such (1956–2022), American musician
 Peter Such (born 1964), English cricketer
 Such A Pretty Girl, a 2007 novel by Laura Weiss

See also
 Screaming Lord Sutch (1940–1999), British musician
 English determiners and indefinite pronoun, for uses of the word such in English